Castiarina alecgemmelli is a species of beetle of the genius Castiarina and family Buprestidae. It was first scientifically documented by Barker in 1987.

Sources 

Beetles described in 1987
Beetles
Castiarina